Jandaíra is the easternmost city in the Brazilian state of Bahia. The city is famous because of the Mangue seco village and beach.

History
Among the main historical events in Jandaíra, the following stand out:
 
1548 — Settlement of nearby Vila de Santa Cruz da Bela Vista by a group of shipwrecked Jesuits, part of the modern-day beach village of Mangue Seco.
1718 — Elevation of the village to the category of parish.
1728 — Elevation of the parish to the category of village, with the name Abadia.
1927 — Abadia changes to the current name Jandaíraz.
1933 — Elevation to the category of municipality, with the title of Jandaíra.

References 

Populated coastal places in Bahia
Municipalities in Bahia